Nextiva is a voice-over-internet-protocol (VoIP) company based in Scottsdale, Arizona. Nextiva focuses on the area of cloud-based communication  Nextiva indicates its telephone and other technology services are currently used by 150,000 businesses.

History
Nextiva was founded in 2006. Six years later, Nextiva had approximately one hundred and twenty workers. In 2014 Nextiva's growth rate, according to Deloitte, was estimated to be 1548%. By June 2016, Nextiva's revenue was close to $100 million. In January, 2017 they had sales of $110 million and a staff of 700. As of 2020, Nextiva had a revenue of $200 million.

Product line 

Nextiva produces a unified communication platform called NextOS. The access to the platform is provided by subscription. NextOS is available as the desktop application in WindowsOS and MacOS, as well as mobile application for Android and iOS.

NextOS renders the services of cloud-based communication, CRM, videoconferencing, mail service, analytics, screen sharing, AI and machine learning. The platform integrates with Outlook, Google Cloud products, QuickBooks, DropBox and ZenDesk.

References 

Telecommunications companies of the United States
Companies established in 2006
VoIP companies of the United States
Companies based in Scottsdale, Arizona